Guissény is a commune in the Finistère department of Brittany in north-western France.

Geography
Guissény is a coastal town lying in the English Channel, it is part of the "Pays de pagan", limited to the northeast by a marine gulf, the gulf (or cove) of Tressény, into which flows a small coastal river, the Quillimadec, which separates it from Kerlouan, and to the west by the Porz Olier (limited to the east by the tip of Dibennou and to the west by that of Beg ar Skeïz), a small residual marine gulf that was once much larger, most of which has been transformed, due to the construction of a dyke, by man into a polder (La Palud de Curnic, where salt marshes once existed) or a pond (Étang du Curnic) which separates Guissény from Plouguerneau, the town s 'extending westward to include a good part of the beach of Vougo (Vougot), the other part being in Plouguerneau; the coastal dunes reach an altitude of up to 13 meters at a place called “la Sècherie”.

To the west of Curnic, the coastal platform is several hundred meters wide and includes a few emerged rocky islets: Karreg Hir (the Karreg Hir causeway extends northwest to the rocks of Lizenn Du and includes numerous islets emerging at low tide), Golhédoc, Énez Du, Tilloc, Énez Croaz-Hent (the latter now being linked to the mainland by a dyke).

Population
The inhabitants of Guissény are called Guisséniens in French.

Breton language
In 2009, 21.55% of primary-school children attended bilingual schools, where Breton language is taught alongside French.

See also
Communes of the Finistère department
List of the works of Bastien and Henry Prigent

References

Mayors of Finistère Association ;

External links

Official website 

Communes of Finistère